Para Handy - Master Mariner is a series produced and broadcast by the BBC, set in the western isles of Scotland in the 1930s, based on the Para Handy books by Neil Munro. It starred Duncan Macrae as Peter "Para Handy" MacFarlane, captain of the puffer Vital Spark.

The series followed the Vital Spark's adventures around the coastal waters of Inner Hebrides and the various schemes that Para Handy would get himself and his crew involved in.

The series was first broadcast in 1959, in black-and-white. Having been subsequently discarded, it is no longer available in the BBC archives.

Cast
Duncan Macrae - Captain Peter "Para Handy" MacFarlane
John Grieve - Dan Macphail, the engineer
Roddy McMillan - Dougie Cameron, the mate
Angus Lennie - Davie "Sunny Jim" Green

Episodes

External links

1959 Scottish television series debuts
1960 Scottish television series endings
Scottish television sitcoms
BBC television dramas
1950s Scottish television series
1960s Scottish television series
Lost BBC episodes
Television shows set in Scotland
1950s British drama television series
1960s British drama television series